Parelius N. Finnerud (20 October 1888 – 9 December 1969) was a Norwegian long-distance runner. He represented TK Tjalve.

At the 1912 Summer Olympics he finished twentieth in the individual cross country competition. Together with his teammates Olaf Hovdenak and Johannes Andersen he finished fourth in the team cross country competition. He became Norwegian champion in the 10,000 metres in 1914.

References

1888 births
1969 deaths
Norwegian male long-distance runners
Athletes (track and field) at the 1912 Summer Olympics
Olympic athletes of Norway
Olympic cross country runners